Albert Cameron was an American architect based in Salem, Ohio.  One of his major projects was the Prospect School, an elementary school in Salem, built in 1896.

Year of birth missing
Year of death missing
Architects from Ohio